The R.B. Pamplin College of Business (commonly known as Pamplin College of Business or Pamplin), is Virginia Tech's business school. Founded in 1965, it has more than 41,000 alumni. The current Dean is Robert Sumichrast. In 1986 the college was renamed following a donation from alumnus Robert B. Pamplin and his son Robert B. Pamplin Jr.

The college offers three different kinds of Master of Business Administration (MBA) degrees, three different Master of Science in Business Administration (MSBA) degrees, and a Master of Accounting and Information Systems (MACIS) degree.  In addition, Pamplin offers two Ph.D. degrees, non-degree executive development programs, and majors and minors for undergraduate students. Pamplin jointly offers a Master of Information Technology (MIT) degree with the Virginia Tech College of Engineering. The most recent national U.S. News & World Report rank shows Pamplin's undergraduate program is 23rd among public institutions and the Evening MBA Program is ranked 16th overall. As of 2015 Pamplin accounts for approximately 20 percent of all business degrees awarded from Virginia's 14 senior public institutions.

History

1925 First bachelor's degree in business offered
1931 First master's degree in business offered
1961 School of Business is established
1965 The school became an official college of Virginia Tech
1966 College of Business accredited by American Association of Collegiate Schools of Business (AACSB)
1969 Master of Accountancy program is established
1980 Department of Business Administration was divided into separate departments
1983 Evening MBA program is established
1986 College of Business receives a donation and is renamed after Robert B. Pamplin and his son
1996 Executive MBA program is established
2002 Pamplin College of Business starts offering hospitality and tourism programs
2007 Diversity Center is established
2013 Apex Systems Center for Innovation and Entrepreneurship is established
2014 Center for Business Intelligence and Analytics is established
2015 Pamplin celebrates 50th Anniversary as a college

Academics
Pamplin offers undergraduate, graduate, and doctoral programs on Virginia Tech's Blacksburg campus.  In addition the college offers MBA programs in Northern Virginia, Richmond, and Roanoke. The undergraduate program offers majors in accounting, business information technology, economics, finance, hospitality, information systems, management, marketing, real estate, and tourism management. Minors are offered in: Applied Business Computing, Business Diversity, Entrepreneurship, International Business, Leadership, Multicultural Diversity Management, and Professional Sales. Pamplin offers study-abroad opportunities for both graduate and undergraduate students. Pamplin students can attend Virginia Tech's Center for European Studies and Architecture in Riva San Vitale, Switzerland, and other European universities offer opportunities as well.

Rankings

Pamplin is a highly regarded business school and is one of a handful of core recruiting schools for some of the nation's most selective firms. Current rankings by the U.S. News & World Report and Bloomberg Businessweek:

Master of Information Technology degree: 2nd overall in the nation according to the 2017 U.S. News & World Report.
Evening MBA program: 7th overall in the nation according to the 2017 U.S. News & World Report.
The Undergraduate program ranks No. 39 overall and No. 23 among the public institutions according to U.S. News & World Report.
Undergraduate program ranked No. 52 overall, No. 24 by employers, Bloomberg Businessweek, 2013.

Departments
Pamplin has several academic departments/schools:
 Accounting and Information Systems
 Business Information Technology
 Economics
 Finance, Insurance, and Business Law
 Hospitality and Tourism Management
 Management
 Marketing
 The Program in Real Estate

Academic centers

Pamplin has a number of "academic centers".

 Apex Systems Center for Innovation and Entrepreneurship
 Center for Business Intelligence and Analytics 
 Center for Leadership Studies
 Business Diversity Center
 Business Leadership Center

Career placement
Pamplin maintains a high job placement for its graduates. According to PayScale's 2015–2016 report, Pamplin's MBA graduates have an average mid career salary of $125,000.

Programs offered
The range of programs offered by Pamplin includes:

Doctorate programs

 PhD in Business
 PhD in Hospitality and Tourism Management

Graduate programs
 Evening MBA with concentration in:
 Corporate and Financial Services Management
 Global Business
 Hospitality and Tourism Management
 Information Systems and Technology
 Organizational Management
 Executive MBA
 Professional MBA
 MIT in Information Technology
 MSBA in Business Analytics
 MSBA in Advanced Marketing Research
 MSBA in Hospitality and Tourism Management
 MACIS in Accounting and Information Systems

Undergraduate programs

 Majors
Accounting and Information Systems
Business Information Technology
Economics
Finance
Hospitality and Tourism Management
Management
Marketing
Real Estate
 Minors
 Applied Business Computing
 Leadership
 Entrepreneurship-New Venture Growth
 International Business
 Multicultural Diversity Management
 Professional Sales
 Business Diversity

Campus locations

 Pamplin offers undergraduate majors/minors, graduate programs, and doctoral programs on the Blacksburg campus at Pamplin Hall and Wallace Hall
 Pamplin offers graduate and professional programs in the Washington metropolitan area, Richmond metropolitan area, and Roanoke metropolitan area.

Metro for students in Washington metropolitan area
Graduate and Professional programs are located near Washington National Airport and Dulles International Airport which are located within the Washington metropolitan area. These programs are served by off-campus stops on the Washington DC Metro.

Leadership
The following is a list of deans of the college:

Clubs and organizations
Some of the most popular clubs are  the Accounting Society, BASIS (Bond And Securities Investing by Students), PRISM, Beta Alpha Psi, Business Technology Club, Business Horizons, Delta Sigma Pi, Hospitality Management Association, Virginia Tech Management Society, National Association of Black Accountants, Pi Sigma Epsilon, Society for Human Resource Management, Student-Managed Endowment for Educational Development, and the American Marketing Association:

Alumni relations
The Pamplin College of Business Alumni Association is an alumni organization for former students of the college. In total 24,185 alumni live in Virginia, and 41,738 reside Domestically and Internationally.

The Pamplin Advisory Council was founded in 1969 and was chartered to offer ideas and guidance to the dean of the college.  In addition, the council assists with connecting the college with the business community. Currently there are over 70 member on the council.

The college publishes a business magazine,  Virginia Tech Business Magazine

Notable alumni

Robert B. Pamplin (business administration 1933) was the president and chairman of the board of Georgia-Pacific and the founder of R.B. Pamplin Corporation in Portland, Oregon.
Thomas C. Richards (general business 1956) is a former General in the United States Air Force and the former chief of staff of the Supreme Headquarters Allied Powers Europe.
Lance L. Smith (business administration 1969) is a former General in the United States Air Force who served as the Commander, U.S. Joint Forces Command, Norfolk, Virginia, and NATO Supreme Allied Commander for Transformation from November 10, 2005 to November 9, 2007. 
Dave Calhoun (accounting 1979) is the chief executive officer of Boeing.
Vahan Janjigian (MBA 1982; Ph.D. finance 1985) is the chief investment strategist at Forbes, vice president and executive director of the Forbes Investors Advisory Institute, and editor of the Forbes Growth Investor and Special Situation Survey investment newsletters.
Wayne Robinson (finance 1980) is a retired American basketball player.
Robert B. Pamplin, Jr. is the chairman, president, and CEO of the R.B. Pamplin Corporation. The Pamplin College of Business at Virginia Tech and the Pamplin School of Business at the University of Portland are named in his honor.

See also
 List of United States business school rankings
 List of business schools in the United States
List of Atlantic Coast Conference business schools
 Virginia Polytechnic Institute and State University
 Virginia Tech College of Engineering
 Business School

References

External links 
 Pamplin College of Business

Virginia Tech
Business schools in Virginia
Educational institutions established in 1965
1965 establishments in Virginia